Timothy J. Ley is an American hematologist and cancer biologist. He is the Lewis T. and Rosalind B. Apple Professor of Oncology in the Department of Medicine, and is chief of the Section of Stem Cell Biology in the Division of Oncology at Washington University in St. Louis.  He is a member of the Alvin J. Siteman Cancer Center.

Ley's research group focuses on the genetics and genomics of acute myeloid leukemia (AML). His lab studies the development of normal and leukemic blood cells. His work is focused on identifying the mutations and epigenetic events that are responsible for the initiation and progression of AML.

Ley led the team that sequenced the first cancer genome (of an AML patient). He has gone on to develop projects that will use whole genome sequencing to help diagnose and treat patients with AML.

To better understand the role of many of the mutations discovered through whole genome sequencing of leukemias, he and his colleagues have constructed several mouse models of AML, which are very similar to human AML.  Dr. Ley's laboratory has also helped to define the roles of granzymes for the functions of cytotoxic and regulatory T cells.

Ley grew up in Lakota, Iowa. He received his B.A. degree from Drake University in 1974, and his M.D. from Washington University School of Medicine in 1978. He did his internship and residency in Medicine at Massachusetts General Hospital, was a Clinical Associate at the NHLBI (National Heart, Lung, and Blood Institute), a Hematology-Oncology Fellow at Washington University Medical Center, and a Senior Investigator at the NHLBI before moving to Washington University in 1986.

In 2015, Ley was appointed to the National Cancer Advisory Board  by President Obama.  Ley was the recipient of the Leopold Griffuel Prize for Basic Science in 2022.

Awards and honors
 Recipient, Leopold Griffuel Prize for Basic Science, Fondation ARC, Paris, France, 2022
 Elected, National Academy of Sciences, 2019
Alfred G. Knudson Prize for Cancer Genetics, National Cancer Institute, 2015
Recipient, The Erasmus Hematology Award, Erasmus MC, 2015
Recipient, E. Donnall Thomas Prize, American Society of Hematology, 2012
Recipient, The George Engelmann Interdisciplinary Award, Academy of Science, St. Louis, 2012
Elected, American Academy of Arts and Sciences, 2010
Treasurer, Association of American Physicians, 2007–2012
Elected, National Academy of Medicine, 2003
Fellow, American Association for the Advancement of Science, 2002
President, American Society for Clinical Investigation, 1997–1998

References

External links
Divisions of Hematology and Oncology
Ley PubMed Citations
"Cancer gene complexity revealed." BBC News. 7 August 2009.

1953 births
Living people
Cancer genomics
Members of the National Academy of Medicine
Fellows of the American Academy of Arts and Sciences
Washington University in St. Louis fellows